Flower Garland with Butterfly is a lost painting by the Flemish artist Michaelina Wautier. It is suspected that the painting is a pendant of a similar still life, Flower Garland with Dragonfly. Both pictures have skulls at either side, follow a similar arrangement of the flowers, and were both painted in 1652.

References

Paintings by Michaelina Wautier

1652 paintings
Flower paintings
Insects in art
Skulls in art